Tofte is an unincorporated community in Tofte Township, Cook County, Minnesota, United States.

Location
Tofte is on the North Shore of Lake Superior, within the Superior National Forest, 27 miles southwest of the city of Grand Marais and 56 miles northeast of the city of Two Harbors. Temperance River State Park, the Gitchi-Gami State Trail, the Superior Hiking Trail, and the Carlton Peak Lookout are all nearby, and the communities of Schroeder and Taconite Harbor are immediately southwest of the town.

Minnesota Highway 61 and Cook County Road 2 (Sawbill Trail) are two of the main routes in the community. 

A post office called Tofte has been in operation since 1897.

History
Tofte was founded in 1893 by Norwegian settlers (and twin brothers) Andrew and John Tofte, their sister Torget and her husband Hans Engelsen. Tofte takes its name from the Norwegian birthplace of its founders. They originally named the town "Carlton" for nearby Carlton Peak, but the name was already used by the town of Carlton, Minnesota.

Much of the town was destroyed by a forest fire in 1910, but it was rebuilt.

Attractions
In 1996, the North Shore Commercial Fishing Museum opened in Tofte. The museum is Minnesota's first dedicated to commercial fishing, and chronicles the history of the Scandinavian immigrants and communities of the North Shore region of Lake Superior, especially their importance to the national commercial fishing industry of the 1880s to 1940s.

Education
All of the county is zoned to Cook County ISD 166.

References

Unincorporated communities in Cook County, Minnesota
Unincorporated communities in Minnesota
Minnesota populated places on Lake Superior